The 2010 Meath Intermediate Football Championship is the 84th edition of the Meath GAA's premier club Gaelic football tournament for intermediate graded teams in County Meath, Ireland. The tournament consists of 15 teams, with the winner going on to represent Meath in the Leinster Intermediate Club Football Championship. The championship starts with a group stage and then progresses to a knock out stage.

No team was relegated from the Senior grade in 2009.

On 3 October 2010, Nobber claimed their 2nd Intermediate championship title when they defeated Carnaross 3-12 to 0-7, succeeding Oldcastle as Intermediate champions.

Kilmainhamwood were relegated from this grade in 2010, after 2 years as an Intermediate club.

Team changes
The following teams have changed division since the 2009 championship season.

From I.F.C.
Promoted to S.F.C.
 Oldcastle  -  (Intermediate Champions)

Relegated to 2010 J.A.F.C.
 Drumconrath

To I.F.C.
Relegted from S.F.C.
 n/a

Promoted from 2009 J.A.F.C.
 Longwood - (Junior 'A' Champions)

Group stage
In the group stage, there are three groups called Group A, B and C. Two teams from each group go through to finals of the tournament. The three teams that finish last in each group go to the relegation play off.

Group A

Round 1:
 Moynalvey 3-6, 4-15 St. Colmcille's, Ashbourne, 16/4/2010,
 Kilmainhamwood 0-10, 1-14 Nobber, Meath Hill, 17/4/2010,
 Carnaross  -  Bye,

Round 2:
 Moynalvey 1-9, 1-17 Nobber, Simonstown, 30/4/2010,
 Carnaross 2-14, 1-8 St. Colmcille's, Pairc Tailteann, 1/5/2010,
 Kilmainhamwood  -  Bye,

Round 3:
 Nobber 0-14, 1-11 St. Colmcille's, Rathkenny, 28/5/2010,
 Carnaross 0-15, 0-8 Kilmainhamwood, Kells, 30/5/2010,
 Moynalvey  -  Bye,

Round 4:
 Carnaross 0-6, 1-7 Moynalvey, Bective, 16/7/2010,
 Kilmainhamwood 1-10, 1-12 St. Colmcille's, Kilberry, 16/7/2010,
 Nobber  -  Bye,

Round 5:
 Carnaross 1-11, 1-11 Nobber, Kells, 6/8/2010,
 Kilmainhamwood 1-12, 1-13 Moynalvey, Kilberry, 8/8/2010,
 St. Colmcille's  -  Bye,

Group B

Round 1:
 Syddan 0-6, 2-10 Longwood, Bective, 18/4/2010,
 Castletown 0-12, 1-9 Na Fianna, Dunderry, 18/4/2010,
 St. Michael's  -  Bye,

Round 2:
 Castletown 1-7, 0-16 Longwood, Pairc Tailteann, 1/5/2010,
 St Michael's 1-13, 1-16 Na Fianna, Athboy, 2/5/2010,
 Syddan  -  Bye,

Round 3:
 St Michael's 0-11, 0-10 Syddan, Drumconrath, 28/5/2010,
 Longwood 0-14, 1-7 Na Fianna, Trim, 29/5/2010,
 Castletown  -  Bye,

Round 4:
 Syddan 1-8, 2-7 Na Fianna, Walterstown, 16/7/2010,
 St. Michael's 2-14, 1-11 Castletown, Rathkenny, 17/7/2010,
 Longwood  -  Bye,

Round 5:
 Syddan 2-13, 2-9 Castletown, Drumconrath, 7/8/2010,
 St. Michael's 1-16, 0-6 Longwood, Athboy, 8/8/2010,
 Na Fianna  -  Bye,

Group C

Round 1:
 Cortown 0-14, 2-10 Ballinlough, Carnaross, 18/4/2010,
 Clann na nGael 0-6, 2-7 Gaeil Colmcille, Kilskyre, 18/4/2010,
 Dunderry  -  Bye,

Round 2:
 Dunderry 0-11, 0-11 Ballinlough, Carlanstown, 30/4/2010,
 Cortown 1-5, 1-8 Gaeil Colmcille, Carnaross, 30/4/2010,
 Clann na nGael  -  Bye,

Round 3:
 Gaeil Colmcille 1-6, 0-8 Ballinlough, Oldcastle, 28/5/2010,
 Dunderry 0-10, 1-7 Clann na nGael, Bohermeen, 30/5/2010,
 Cortown  -  Bye,

Round 4:
 Clann na nGael 0-8, 1-9 Ballinlough, Bohermeen, 15/7/2010,
 Dunderry 1-7, 0-9 Cortown, Athboy, 16/7/2010,
 Gaeil Colmcille  -  Bye,

Round 5:
 Clann na nGael 0-14, 2-11 Cortown, Kilskyre, 7/8/2010,
 Dunderry 1-7, 0-9 Gaeil Colmcille, Carnaross, 8/8/2010,
 Ballinlough  -  Bye,

Knock-out Stage

Relegation Play Off

Game 1: Kilmainhamwood 3-10, 1-12 Castletown, Nobber, 22/8/2010,

Game 2: Castletown 4-6, 0-10 Clann na nGael, Moynalty, 10/9/2010,

Game 3: Kilmainhamwood 1-8, 1-16 Clann na nGael, Castletown, 18/9/2010.

Finals

The teams in the quarter-finals are the second placed teams in each group and the worst finished group winner. The two best finished winners in the groups were Nobber and St. Michael's who automatically qualify for the semi-finals.

Quarter-Final

 Dunderry 0-10, 0-5 Longwood, Trim, 22/8/2010,
 Gaeil Colmcille 1-9, 2-8 Carnaross, Pairc Tailteann, 21/8/2010 

Semi-Final

 Nobber 0-12 , 0-8 Dunderry, Pairc Tailteann, 4/9/2010,
 St. Michael's 0-7, 0-9 Carnaross, Pairc Tailteann, 4/9/2010,

Final

 Nobber 3-12, 0-7 Carnaross, Pairc Tailteann, 3/10/2010,

References

External links

Meath Intermediate Football Championship
Meath Intermediate Football Championship